Natural Product Research is a peer-reviewed scientific journal covering research on natural products chemistry. It was established in 1992 by Atta-ur-Rahman.

Abstracting and indexing
The journal is abstracted and indexed in
CAB Abstracts
Cambridge Crystallographic Data Centre
Chemical Abstracts Service
National Library of Medicine
PubMed
Science Citation Index Expanded
Scopus.

Taylor & Francis academic journals
English-language journals
Chemistry journals